Chandan Ka Palna Resham Ki Dori is a television serial that appeared on Zee TV channel in 2001. The series aired every Monday to Friday at 9pm IST. The show was inspired from the Hindi movie Chori Chori Chupke Chupke, and deals with the somewhat taboo subject of a childless couple and a surrogate mother.

Synopsis
The story revolves around the Bhimani family, where the head of household, Mr. Bhimani pressures his son to produce a 'male heir' for their business empire. But he is unaware of the situation that his son and daughter-in-law are unable to have a child due to medical issues. However, to fulfill the desire of their father, the hapless couple get into an arrangement with another woman to be a surrogate mother for their male child. But just when everything seems to be going smoothly between the husband, the wife and the would-be mother of the child, complications arrive and a drama starts enfolding that threatens to blow in the face of the once happy family. Now the questions remain that will the ‘other’ woman give away the male heir and quietly walk out of the Bhimani family?

Cast
 Vikram Gokhale as Mr Jitendra Bhimani: The head of the family. Nirang, Mitali, Prashant, Ritish and Priya's father
 Apara Mehta—Kusum: Virendra's wife
 Pramatesh Mehta as Virendra Parekh: Kusum's husband
 Ragini Shah—Mrs. Janki Bhimani: Jitendra's first wife and Nirang, Mitali, Prashant, Ritish and Priya's mother
 Darshan Zariwala—Nirang Bhimani: Jitendra's eldest son and Mitali's twin
 Sajni Hanspal—Ruchi Bhimani: Nirang's wife
 Supriya Karnik —Mitali Bhimani: Jeetendra's eldest daughter and Nirang's twin
 Manoj Joshi as Prashant Bhimani: Shikha's husband
 Resham Tipnis as Shikha Bhimani: Prashant's wife and Reema's mother
 Sanjeev Seth—Ritish Bhimani: Jitendra's youngest son
 Suchita Trivedi—Binita Bhimani: Ritish's childless wife
 Vaishnavi Mahant—Shreya Dalal (the surrogate mother)

References

Indian television soap operas
Zee TV original programming
2001 Indian television series debuts
2001 Indian television series endings